Tampere Exhibition and Sports Centre is an indoor venue in Tampere, Finland. It hosted European Wrestling Championships in 2008.

The centre has 4 halls and the first one was built in 1985.

See also
List of indoor arenas in Finland
List of indoor arenas in Nordic countries

References

 Stadiums in Finland. Worldstadiums.com.

External links 
 
 

Indoor arenas in Finland
Buildings and structures in Tampere